The Complete Far Side: 1980–1994  is a set of two hard-cover books which contains the entire run of The Far Side comic strip by Gary Larson. The two volumes are presented in a slipcase. The collection contains more than 1,100 comics that had not previously appeared in any other Far Side books. The comics are presented in chronological order by year of publication. The foreword was written by Steve Martin.

In 2014, The Complete Far Side was reissued in a slipcased paperback edition. This edition is spread over three volumes instead of two.

References

2003 books
The Far Side
Comic strip collection books